The 2011 Kazakhstan First Division was the 17th edition of Kazakhstan First Division, the second level football competition in Kazakhstan. 18 teams to play against each other on home-away system. Two top teams gain promotion to the Premier League next season.

Teams

Stadia and locations

League table

References

External links
soccerway.com; standings, results, fixtures

Kazakhstan First Division seasons
2
Kazakhstan
Kazakhstan